In mathematics, the Contou-Carrère symbol 〈a,b〉 is a Steinberg symbol defined on pairs of invertible elements of the ring of Laurent power series over an Artinian ring k, taking values in the group of units of k.

Definition

If k is an Artinian local ring, then any invertible formal Laurent series a with coefficients in k can be written uniquely as

where w(a) is an integer, the elements ai are in k, and are in m if i is negative, and is a unit if i = 0.

The Contou-Carrère symbol 〈a,b〉 of a and b is defined to be

References

Number theory